Unitec Institute of Technology (Māori: Te Whare Wānanga o Wairaka) is the largest institute of technology in Auckland, New Zealand. 16,844 students study programmes from certificate to postgraduate degree level (levels 1 to 9) across a range of subjects.

The main campus is situated in Mt Albert while a secondary Waitākere campus is situated in Henderson and there are various pop-ups throughout the North Shore. It also offers programs overseas.

History

Unitec was founded as Carrington Technical Institute in 1976 on the Mt Albert site on Carrington road, which has 55 hectares of grounds. The area on which Unitec's main campus is located was formerly home to the Whau Lunatic Asylum, later known as Carrington Hospital. The hospital building (Building 1) is an imposing brick Italianate-Romanesque structure, located at the northern end of the Unitec Campus. The hospital building was the largest in New Zealand when it was built in the 1860s. The hospital was decommissioned during the early 1990s, and the building is now part of Unitec.

The name changed to Carrington Polytechnic in 1987 and then to "Unitec Institute of Technology" in 1994. Unitec applied for University status in 1999, but the Government ruled, somewhat controversially, in 2005 that Unitec did not meet the academic criteria of a university and would remain an Institute of Technology.

In 2006, Unitec opened its Waitakere Campus in the centre of Henderson, West Auckland. The campus is a joint development with the former Waitakere City Council and includes the new Waitākere Central Library.  Unitec's Waitakere campus offers introductory computing, community development, and nursing courses.

In August 2011, Unitec opened a campus in Albany, on Auckland's North Shore, but it was closed in December 2016. On 1 April 2020, Unitec Institute of Technology was subsumed into New Zealand Institute of Skills & Technology alongside the 15 other Institutes of Technology and Polytechnics (ITPs).

In July 2018 Unitec made the news after revealing deficits totaling nearly $100 million over four years and prompting the Education Minister Chris Hipkins to consider interventions. It was not alone by September 2018 there were four of the country's polytechnics at a high financial risk with 10 making deficits and none were expected to make the surplus that the government required. In 2019 a major restructure across the polytechnic sector was announced.

Campus libraries
There are three libraries across the two campuses:
Mt Albert, Te Puna Library
Mt Albert, Building 1 Library
Waitakere Campus Library

Courses

Study areas
 Animal Health, Management and Welfare
 Architecture: Architecture, Landscape Architecture, Interior Design and Landscaping and Garden Design
 Arts: Art and Design (Graphic Design and Animation, Photography, Product and Furniture Design, Visual Arts), Performing Arts and Screen Arts (Acting, Contemporary Dance, Costume Design, Lighting and Sound, Props and Art Department)
 Bridging Education: Study and Career Preparation
 Business: Accounting and Finance, Digital Marketing, Management (Operations and Human Resources), Marketing, and Real Estate
 Computing and Information Technology: Business Intelligence, Computer Networks, Cloud Computing, Cyber security, Game Development, Internet of Things, Software Engineering 
 Conservation and Biodiversity Management
 Construction: Construction Management, Quantity Surveying, Property Development, Construction Supervision
 Early Childhood Education
 Education Studies
 Engineering: Automotive, Civil, Electrical and Electronics, and Land Surveying
 Healthcare: Nursing and Medical Imaging
 Language Studies – Teaching English, Interpreting, English (as an additional language), IELTS, and Māori
 Policing
 Social Work and Community Development
 Sport, Exercise and Recreation: Exercise, Sport Coaching, and Community Sport and Recreation
 Supported Learning
 Trades: Automotive Engineering, Building and Carpentry, Electrical, Fabrication, Welding, Mechanical, Plumbing, Gasfitting, and Drainlaying
 Veterinary Nursing

Qualifications
Unitec teaches over 128 courses ranging from Short Courses to master's degrees.

 12 Postgraduate Diploma and Master's Degree programs
 33 Bachelors Diplomas and Graduate Diploma programs 
 17 Diploma programs
 44 Academic certificate programs
 22 Short Course programs

The emphasis in all learning areas is for a lot of practical (hands-on) learning as well as theoretical learning.  This differs from the traditional model of university-level tuition, which is predominantly theory.  For example, the Introduction to Policing course is delivered in partnership with the New Zealand Police. Also, the School of Computing Science has an industry internship program with IBM, which includes the IBM Center at the Mt Albert (Carrington) Campus.

References

Education in Auckland
Te Pūkenga – New Zealand Institute of Skills and Technology
Educational institutions established in 1976
1976 establishments in New Zealand
2020 disestablishments in New Zealand